Vampire on Titus is the sixth studio album by American indie rock band Guided by Voices.

Background

Vampire on Titus was recorded after a short-lived dissolution of the band (after 1992's "farewell" album Propeller) but prior to the full-time regrouping that occurred with the assemblage of the Bee Thousand album and the band's return to live performance.  The album was recorded with a skeletal line-up consisting of Robert Pollard, Jim Pollard and Tobin Sprout. Jim Shepard of V-3 remarked to Pollard once that he “was like a vampire on Titus, sucking songs out of the earth.” Pollard lived on Titus Ave. in Dayton, Ohio. The album is often acknowledged as being the most abrasively lo-fi in the entire Guided by Voices catalog.

Track listing
All songs written by Robert Pollard unless otherwise noted.

Side A
 ""Wished I Was a Giant"" – 2:43
 "#2 in the Model Home Series" (R. Pollard, Tobin Sprout) – 1:45
 "Expecting Brainchild" (Jim Pollard, R. Pollard) – 2:30
 "Superior Sector Janitor X" (J. Pollard, R. Pollard, Sprout) – 0:37
 "Donkey School" (Sprout) – 1:03
 "Dusted" – 2:08
 "Marchers in Orange" (J. Pollard, R. Pollard) – 1:24
 "Sot" (Sprout, R. Pollard) – 2:35
 "World of Fun" – 0:55

Side B
 "Jar of Cardinals" – 1:22
 "Unstable Journey" – 2:15
 "E-5" (J. Pollard, R. Pollard, Sprout) – 1:29
 "Cool Off Kid Kilowatt" (J. Pollard, R. Pollard, Sprout) – 0:56
 "Gleemer (The Deeds of Fertile Jim)" (Sprout) – 2:24
 "Wondering Boy Poet" (R. Pollard, Sprout) – 0:59
 "What About It?" – 1:37
 "Perhaps Now the Vultures" – 2:23
 "Non-Absorbing" – 1:37

Personnel

Guided by Voices 
 Robert Pollard – vocals, guitar, drums
 Jim Pollard – guitar
 Tobin Sprout – vocals, guitar, bass

Technical 

 Bruce Greenwald – photography
 John Mandeville – cover artwork

References

1993 albums
Guided by Voices albums
Scat Records albums